Te Apiti is a wind farm owned and operated by Meridian Energy. It is located on 11.5 km² of land north of the Manawatu Gorge in the North Island of New Zealand. At 90.75 MW, it was New Zealand's largest capacity wind farm until September 2007, when the third stage of the nearby Tararua Wind Farm was completed.

The $100 million wind farm consists of 55 separate turbines capable of generating 1.65 MW each, representing a total capacity of 90.75 MW. Each turbine is atop a  tower. It is fitted with 3 blades each 35 metres in length.

Location
The site near the Manawatu Gorge area is ideal for wind farms. The Tararua and Ruahine Ranges provide a barrier to the predominantly westerly winds that flow across New Zealand. Between the two ranges lies a lower range of hills that serve to funnel the wind. TrustPower, another New Zealand electricity generator and retailer, operates a wind farm on the south side of the Manawatu Gorge.

Carbon offsets
The Te Apiti wind farm is also a carbon offset project. In 2005 the British bank HSBC purchased 125,000 tonnes worth of carbon credits from Meridian generated by the wind farm. Meridian Energy also sold the Dutch government 530,000 tonnes of carbon credits from Te Apiti. The price per tonne was considered to be about $10.40 a tonne. In both cases, the carbon credits for Te Apiti were from New Zealand's Assigned amount units allocated under the Kyoto Protocol. The New Zealand Government granted the AAUs to Meridian Energy as an incentive for carbon neutral power development under the Projects to Reduce Emissions programme (or PRE).

As of 2007, installed capacity of wind turbines in New Zealand has reached 321 MW and a further 46.5 MW is under construction.

Transmission
Te Apiti was the first wind farm in New Zealand to connect directly to Transpower's national grid. Previously constructed windfarms, including Hau Nui and Tararua, connected to the national grid via local distribution and sub-transmission lines.

Electricity from the 55 turbines is sent via a  network of underground cables to the Te Apiti substation near the lookout, where the electricity is stepped-up to 110 kV for transmission. A  single-circuit transmission line connects the wind farm to the national grid at Transpower's Woodville substation.

Virtual field trip

The New Zealand online education programme, LEARNZ, conducted a virtual field trip to Te Apiti Wind Farm in April 2008. Over 1500 New Zealand school students joined LEARNZ teacher Darren on this trip. Telephone conferences were held between students and wind farm staff. Two telephone conferences were held while Darren and Meridian staff were on top of a 70m high wind turbine.

See also

Te Rere Hau Wind Farm
Wind farm
Wind power in New Zealand

References

External links

Te Apiti Wind Farm pictures
LEARNZ Virtual Field Trips

Buildings and structures in Manawatū-Whanganui
Wind farms in New Zealand